Jeju High School (Hangul : 제주고등학교, Hanja : 濟州高等學校) is a public high school located in Jeju City, South Korea.

External links
 Official website

High schools in South Korea
Schools in Jeju Province
Jeju City
Educational institutions established in 1907
1907 establishments in Korea